Alejandro 'Ale' Martín Méndez (born 24 April 1990) is a Spanish footballer who plays for UD Lanzarote as a goalkeeper.

Club career
Born in Las Palmas, Canary Islands, Martín finished his graduation with UD Las Palmas, and made his senior debuts with the reserves in the 2008–09 season, in Segunda División B. In August 2010 he was loaned to neighbouring UD Lanzarote, in Tercera División. A season later Martín returned to the B-team, now in the fourth level.

On 15 October 2012, due to Mariano Barbosa's suspension and Raúl Lizoain's injury, Martín made his professional debut, starting in a 2–3 away loss against Real Madrid Castilla, in the Segunda División championship; it was his maiden first team appearance, however. Released in 2015, he moved to fellow Tercera División side CD Unión Sur Yaiza on 25 September.

References

External links

1990 births
Living people
Footballers from Las Palmas
Spanish footballers
Association football goalkeepers
Segunda División players
Segunda División B players
Tercera División players
Tercera Federación players
UD Las Palmas Atlético players
UD Lanzarote players
UD Las Palmas players